Christopher Guard (born 5 December 1953) is an English actor, musician and artist. He is known for roles such as Jim Hawkins in Return to Treasure Island (1986), Bellboy in Doctor Who serial The Greatest Show in the Galaxy (1988), Marcellus in I, Claudius (1976), Marius in Les Misérables (1978), Ken Hodges in the medical drama Casualty (1993), and voicing Frodo Baggins in The Lord of the Rings (1978).

Guard has appeared in Memoirs of a Survivor (1981) and A Woman of Substance (1985). His first role on television was the young David Copperfield in the BBC's 1966 TV serial adaptation, followed by Pip in Great Expectations (1967). A long list of credits include appearances in Dixon of Dock Green, Z-Cars, Secret Army, Shoestring, The Professionals, Lovejoy, Bugs, Poirot, The Bill and Doctors. He has played roles in two works by Dennis Potter: Play For Today: Joe's Ark (1974) and Blackeyes (1989). He demonstrated his singing ability in the film version of Stephen Sondheim's A Little Night Music (1977) in the role of Henrik Egerman alongside Elizabeth Taylor. He played Ferdinand in the BBC Shakespeare production of The Tempest (opposite his cousin Pippa as Miranda) in 1980.

In recent years, Guard has worked on expanding his musical career and developing his artwork for private sale online.

Early life
Guard was born in Hammersmith, London and educated at Latymer Upper School.

Career

Guard's on-screen debut came aged 12 as the young David Copperfield in BBC television's 1966 serial adaptation of the Charles Dickens novel. Producer Campbell Logan and Director Joan Craft had failed to find a suitable young actor from a drama academy and started to enquire about children of actors. 
Guard said: "I never went to any kind of stage school... I went up once, twice, and three times [to Threshold House for auditions] – third time it was just me and one other boy and they chose me. The next thing I knew, there were four big, fat BBC scripts on the doormat and I was learning the lines and rehearsing in an old church hall and working with amazing people like Joss Ackland." Only one episode to feature Guard (episode 3, "A Long Journey") is known to exist.

Further television work followed, including an episode of Dixon of Dock Green and in 1967 he landed the role of young Pip in another BBC Dickens serial, Great Expectations, directed by Alan Bridges, who also directed Guard in a Play For Today called "Joe's Ark" written by Dennis Potter. In 1974, Guard became a member of the National Theatre at the age of 20.

Further roles in high-profile BBC TV productions followed, including Marcellus in I, Claudius (1976) and Marius in Les Misérables (1978). In 1978, Guard and his brother, Dominic both voiced characters in an animated film version of The Lord of the Rings (1978). Chris voiced Frodo Baggins and Dominic voiced Pippin.

The late seventies and early eighties were a busy time for Guard with appearances in Shoestring, The Professionals and leading roles in period costume dramas such as My Cousin Rachel (1983) by Daphne du Maurier and A Woman of Substance (1985) written by Barbara Taylor Bradford, Guard worked alongside Jenny Seagrove, Deborah Kerr and Liam Neeson.

The actor's next project was with Brian Blessed, playing the lead character of Jim Hawkins in Return to Treasure Island (1986). The 10-part miniseries was filmed in Wales, Spain and Jamaica and directed by Piers Haggard and Alex Kirby. It is a sequel to the Robert Louis Stevenson classic and again features Long John Silver.

Guard entered the world of science fiction for the role of Bellboy in the Doctor Who serial The Greatest Show in the Galaxy (1988). His character builds and repairs robotic clowns at the Psychic Circus. Guard considered Bellboy a victim: “All these things were happening to him. Although he has had power, the power is all kind of taken away from him. Ultimately, he turns his own creations, in a Frankenstein way, upon himself”. The episodes were filmed in Dorset and famously at the BBC Elstree Centre using the car park to house the large circus top. Summing up the experience on location, Guard said "There was a vibe about the whole shoot. It was very hot out there…but it just felt good."

From September 1993, Guard played the role of Clinical Nurse Specialist Ken Hodges in long-running BBC drama, Casualty. The nurse left Holby after admitting he loved established character, Charlie Fairhead. Guard said about the character: “He’s someone whose life is outside my experience, but we’re not making any great statement by including a man who happens to be gay”.

Music

As a musician and songwriter Guard has written award-winning songs and his bands Leapfrogtown  and What the Fox have played festivals supporting Toploader and venues such as The Troubadour and Ronnie Scott's Jazz Club. His song 'Attention Deficit Girl' won the Guild of International Songwriters Rock Award in 2004.

In 2001, Christopher composed a song to celebrate the promotion of Fulham to the Premier Division. The song, entitled ‘Here to Stay’ by his band Lucky Revolution, features lead vocals by his daughter Daisy and backing vocals by his daughter Rosie and partner, Cathy Shipton.

Songwriting has been a life-long passion and his original songs have featured on radio, television and film. This included collaborating on Candy Guard's animated series, Pond Life for Channel 4 (1996 and 2000) and recently contributions to the soundtrack for the film ‘Mercy’ (2020), directed and written by Wendy Morgan.

Many of these songs can be viewed and purchased online. 'Blind Side' is Chris's latest release, in 2021.

Indians in Moscow

In 1991, Stuart Walton and Pete Riches reformed the band, Indians in Moscow and recruited Guard as lead singer. Together they released an initial single, 'Wrong Love' (1991) and then recorded an album, 'Ten Days to Live' (1994) on Nemesis Records. Walton and Guard continued to work together as part of The Bloogs up until 2012 and then as Leapfrogtown.

Art
Alongside his work in film and music Chris is an established artist. His work is inspired by nature and ‘our strange and paradoxical relationship with it’. His clients include British and American actors and musicians.

Family
Guard has two daughters from his marriage with Lesley Dunlop and one daughter with actress Cathy Shipton. 

Christopher ran the London Marathon in 1995 in aid of the ‘Save the Cottage Campaign’ and in total he has run five marathons and many half-marathons supporting Leukemia Research and the British Heart Foundation and other charities.

He has been a committed vegetarian since childhood.

Selected filmography

Film

Television

Theatre

References

External links

 Personal website
 

Living people
1953 births
English male film actors
English male soap opera actors
English male voice actors
People educated at Latymer Upper School